Elena Tobiash is a Russian former pair skater. With partner Sergei Smirnov, she placed seventh at the 1993 European Championships in Helsinki. She works as a coach in Iowa.

Competitive highlights 
(with Smirnov)

References 

Russian female pair skaters
Living people
Russian emigrants to the United States
Year of birth missing (living people)